Edwin Webster may refer to:

 Edwin Hanson Webster (1829–1893), U.S. Congressman from Maryland
 Edwin S. Webster (1867–1950), American electrical engineer and co-founder of Stone & Webster